The traditional dances of the Middle East (also known as Oriental dance) span a large variety of folk traditions throughout North Africa, the Middle East, and Central Asia.

For detailed information on specific dances of the region, see the main entries as follows:

 Arab World dances: Ardah, Baladi, Belly dance, Dabke, Deheyeh, Fann at-Tanbura, Khaleegy, Mizmar, Raqs sharqi, Shamadan, Tahtib, Tanoura, Yowlah
 Assyrian folk dance: Khigga
 Kurdish dance: Dilan
 Persian dance: Classical Persian dance
 Turkish dance: Çiftetelli, Halay
Jewish dance: Hora, Tza'ad Teimani, Israeli Folk Dances

Western dance is being incorporated in the Middle East.

See also 
 Sufi whirling
 Zaffa

References

External links

 From dabke to buraa, dance is integral to Middle Eastern culture
 Sacred World of Middle-Eastern Dance